Yosemite National Park is located in the central Sierra Nevada of California. Three wilderness areas are adjacent to Yosemite: the Ansel Adams Wilderness to the southeast, the Hoover Wilderness to the northeast, and the Emigrant Wilderness to the north.

Two federally designated Wild and Scenic Rivers, the Merced and the Tuolumne, begin within Yosemite's borders and flow westward through the Sierra foothills, into the Central Valley of California. Annual park visitation exceeds 3.5 million, with most visitor use concentrated in the seven-square-mile (18 km2) area of Yosemite Valley.

The geography of the Yosemite area can be visualized with the clickable map, below:

Rocks and erosion

Almost all of the landforms in the Yosemite area are cut from the granitic rock of the Sierra Nevada Batholith (a batholith is a large mass of intrusive igneous rock that formed deep below the surface). About 5% of the park's landforms (mostly in its eastern margin near Mount Dana) are metamorphosed volcanic and sedimentary rocks. These rocks are called roof pendants because they were once the roof of the underlying granitic rock.

Erosion acting upon different types of uplift-created joint and fracture systems is responsible for creating the valleys, canyons, domes, and other features we see today. These joints and fracture systems do not move, and are therefore not faults. Spacing between joints is controlled by the amount of silica in the granite and granodiorite rocks; more silica tends to create a more resistant rock, resulting in larger spaces between joints and fractures.

Pillars and columns, such as Washington Column and Lost Arrow, are created by cross joints. Erosion acting on master joints is responsible for creating valleys and later canyons. The single most erosive force over the last few million years has been large alpine glaciers, which have turned the previously V-shaped river-cut valleys into U-shaped glacial-cut canyons (such as Yosemite Valley and Hetch Hetchy Valley). Exfoliation (caused by the tendency of crystals in plutonic rocks to expand at the surface) acting on granitic rock with widely spaced joints is responsible for creating domes such as Half Dome and North Dome and inset arches like Royal Arches.

Popular features

Yosemite Valley represents only one percent of the park area, but this is where most visitors arrive and stay. The Tunnel View is the first view of the Valley for many visitors and is extensively photographed. El Capitan, a prominent granite cliff that looms over Yosemite Valley, is one of the most popular rock climbing destinations in the world because of its diverse range of climbing routes in addition to its year-round accessibility. Granite domes such as Sentinel Dome and Half Dome rise , respectively, above the valley floor.

The high country of Yosemite contains beautiful areas such as Tuolumne Meadows, Dana Meadows, the Clark Range, the Cathedral Range, and the Kuna Crest. The Sierra crest and the Pacific Crest Trail run through Yosemite, with peaks of red metamorphic rock, such as Mount Dana and Mount Gibbs, and granite peaks, such as Mount Conness. The Lyell Glacier is the largest glacier in Yosemite National Park and is one of the few remaining in the Sierra Nevada today.

The park has three groves of ancient giant sequoia (Sequoiadendron giganteum) trees; the Mariposa Grove (200 trees), the Tuolumne Grove (25 trees), and the Merced Grove (20 trees). This species grows larger in volume than any other and is one of the tallest and longest-lived.

Water and ice

Hydrologic processes, including glaciation, flooding, and fluvial geomorphic response, have been fundamental in creating landforms in the park. Wetlands in Yosemite occur in valley bottoms throughout the park, and are often hydrologically linked to nearby lakes and rivers through seasonal flooding and groundwater movement.

Yosemite is famous for its high concentration of waterfalls in a small area. Numerous sheer drops, glacial steps and hanging valleys in the park provide many places for waterfalls to exist, especially during April, May, and June (the snowmelt season). Also in Yosemite Valley is the much lower volume Ribbon Falls, which has the highest single vertical drop, . Perhaps the most prominent of the Yosemite Valley waterfalls is Bridalveil Fall, which is the waterfall seen from the Tunnel View viewpoint at the east end of the Wawona Tunnel. Wapama Falls in Hetch Hetchy Valley is another notable waterfall. Hundreds of ephemeral waterfalls also exist in the park.

All glaciers in the park are relatively small glaciers that occupy areas that are in almost permanent shade, such as north- and northeast-facing cirques. None of the Yosemite glaciers are a remnant of the much, much larger Ice Age alpine glaciers responsible for sculpting the Yosemite landscape. Instead, they were formed during one of the neoglacial episodes that have occurred since the thawing of the Ice Age (such as the Little Ice Age). Climate change has reduced the number and size of glaciers around the world. Many Yosemite glaciers, including Merced Glacier, which was discovered by John Muir in 1871 and bolstered his glacial origins theory of the Yosemite area, have disappeared and most of the others have lost up to 75% of their surface area.

Climate

Yosemite has a Mediterranean climate (Köppen climate classification Csa), meaning most precipitation falls during the mild winter, and the other seasons are nearly dry (less than 3% of precipitation falls during the long, hot summers). Because of orographic lift, precipitation increases with elevation up to  where it slowly decreases to the crest. Snow does not typically persist on the ground until November in the high country. It accumulates all winter and into March or early April.

At elevations above , the hot, dry summer temperatures are moderated by frequent summer thunderstorms, along with snow that can persist into July. The combination of dry vegetation, low relative humidity, and thunderstorms results in frequent lightning-caused fires as well.

Freezing temperatures have been recorded in every month of the year.

Notes

Yosemite National Park